Better Man is a 2016 Taiwanese romance, family television drama starring Lin Yo-Wei, Tender Huang, Jolin Chien, Cindy Lien, Shara Lin and Hope Lin. Filming began on May 5, 2016 and is filmed as it airs. The original broadcast began on June 1, 2016 on SET Metro, airing weekdays (Monday through Friday) at 8:00 pm.

Synopsis
The Yang brothers have it all — good looks, brains and family background. But each shuns romantic entanglements for his own reasons. Yang Zhen Wei is the workaholic oldest brother who only has his mind set on expanding his catering business. Yang Zhen Hao is the middle brother who works in the entertainment industry and as a fitness instructor. Yang Zhen Kai is the meticulous youngest brother who has been given the position of CEO of the family empire. How will the brothers handle their emotions when they each meet a woman who turns their perfect worlds upside down?

Cast

Main cast
Lin Yo-Wei 林佑威 as Yang Zhen Wei 楊振偉
Tender Huang 黃騰浩 as Yang Zhen Hao 楊振浩 (Jerry Yang)
Jolin Chien 簡宏霖 as Yang Zhen Kai 楊振凱
Cindy Lien 連俞涵 as Wu Yi Xin 吾以心
Shara Lin 林逸欣 as Wu Yi An 吾以安
Hope Lin 林可彤 as Yao You Zhen 姚又真 (May Yao)

Supporting cast
Shen Hairong 沈海蓉 as Yang Chen Shun Yu 楊孟舜玉
Lia Lee 李相林 as Guan Mei Yu 關美妤
Jian Chang 檢場 as Wu Jia Xing 吾家興
Doris Kuang 況明潔 as Lin Hui Lan 林蕙蘭
Bebe Chang 杜姸 as Ding Yu Chen 丁雨晨
Don Wong 王道 as Yang Guo Zheng 楊國政
Hu Pei Lien 胡佩蓮 as Xu Yu Fang 許毓芳

Cameos
 as Liu Da Wei 劉大緯
Hsu Shou-hung 鄒守宏 as Guan Qi Xiang 关啟祥
Chang Kuang-chieh 張光傑 as Chen Qing Dong 陈慶東
Chung Lun-li 鍾倫理 as factory manager
 as Zhang Wei De 張威德
 as Ding Yu Wei 丁雨薇 (photo only)
 as Rui Yi 瑞姨
Nylon Chen as He Yan Zhi 何彥智
 as Jiang Ning 蔣甯
?? as Daniel
?? as Katy
?? as Zi Qi 子奇
?? Xu Xin Yan 徐欣妍

Soundtrack

Better Man Original TV Soundtrack (OST) (我的極品男友 電視原聲帶) was released on August 16, 2016 by various artists under Universal Music (TW). It contains 13 tracks total, in which 8 tracks are various instrumental versions of the songs. The opening theme is track 1 "Faded Pictures 屬於你和我之間的事" by Vanness Wu. The closing theme "All You Did 都是你害的" by Bii is not featured on the official soundtrack CD since singer Bii is signed exclusively to Linfair Records.

Track listing

Songs not featured on the official soundtrack album.
All You Did 都是你害的 by Bii 畢書盡
38 by Bii 畢書盡
Maybe Baby by Bii 畢書盡
That's Where I Wanna Be 想 by Dino Lee 李玉璽
I Love You, I Do by Ian Chen 陳彥允
Gonna Be OK by Nana Lee 李千娜
Unexpected Encounter 不期而遇 by Rachel Liang 梁文音

Broadcast

Episode ratings
Competing dramas on rival channels airing at the same time slot were:
SET Taiwan - Taste of Life
FTV - Spring Flower
TTV - Fighting Meiling
CTV - Golden Darling, The Imperial Doctress, A Good Day
CTS - The Legend of Mi Yue, Memory, Life As An Ocean
GTV Variety - KO ONE Re-act (re-run), KO ONE: RE-MEMBER

Awards and nominations

References

External links
Better Man SETTV Official website 
Better Man EBC Website 
 

2016 Taiwanese television series debuts
2016 Taiwanese television series endings
Sanlih E-Television original programming
Eastern Television original programming
Taiwanese romance television series